Hassan Matrud  (born 1 January 1976) is a former Iraqi football defender who played for Iraq at the 1996 AFC Asian Cup. He played for Iraq between 1996 and 1999.

He was also called up for the 1999 Pan Arab Games and 2000 AFC Asian Cup qualification.

References

Iraqi footballers
Iraq international footballers
1996 AFC Asian Cup players
Association football defenders
1976 births
Living people